The Wild Mouse was a wooden roller coaster located in Blackpool Pleasure Beach which opened in 1958. It was one of only four remaining wooden Wild Mouse coasters left in the world as of the end of the 2017 season, and was held in very high regard as one of the finest and most extreme examples of Wild Mouse coasters.

After remaining closed for the majority of the 2017 season, the ride was removed in January 2018 to make way for "future developments".

History

Both the design and construction of the Wild Mouse, which begun in 1955, were done entirely in-house by the Pleasure Beach. Designed by Frank Wright and opened in 1958 it was the first major ride to be built at the Pleasure Beach since World War II.

The ride was subsequently modified in the 1960s by the Velare Brothers (the originators of Sky Wheels and Space Wheels). The top circuit preceding the switchbacks, containing a big drop and a shallower dip, was added making the ride about  longer at 1,266 ft. Apparently, this change was inspired by a similar alteration of the Velare's Wild Mouse at Nu-Pike in Long Beach, California.

Ride layout and experience

The Wild Mouse was by far the smallest of the "adult" coasters at the pleasure beach. The ride itself was packed into more-or-less a cube, bar one turn which pops out over the busy footpath below. Unlike most versions of this type of ride, passengers sat one in front of the other, in tandem.

From the station, two 90 degree turns lead to the lift hill. Halfway up this, the car passed underneath another part of the track, so close that it was quite easily possible to reach up and touch it. At the top came the first of many 90° "near miss" turns, as the car would nearly plough straight into the turret of the nearby Ghost Train. Trim brakes were present just before the next turn, which lead to the first drop; however, these were rarely used. Even if the brakes were working, the car launched itself into the steep first drop, with the proximity of the structure giving a real feeling of speed.

Following this drop, the ride went through a traditional zig-zag section, common to all Wild Mice, where the car darts forward and backward, gathering speed as it goes. These turns (as with almost all on this ride) were particularly tight, with the car wheels noticeably lifting from the track. Following this were two more very sharp 90° turns, followed immediately by two steep drops, one after the other and, both well hidden amongst the structure. These were followed by the aforementioned turnaround out of the structure over the heads of the queue pen (possibly designed to give the impression that the car has "burst" out of the ride). This lead the car heading straight towards the lift hill, only for a violent right-left chicane to throw the car aside at the last moment. This is immediately followed by a last hidden dip, throwing riders into the air, immediately followed by another 90° "near-miss" turn resulting in extremely high lateral G-Forces of 1.8 g. One final turn brought the car back toward the station.

Closure
The ride was temporarily closed in November 2007, for a 'complete refurbishment' of the ride, replacing wood and repainting the entire structure., re-opening in the Summer of 2008.

Magnetic brakes were installed on the final brake-run of the ride during the 2016–17 winter closed season, eliminating the need for manually operated brakes (as was previously the case with the friction brakes). The ride re-opened in April 2017 following installation and testing of the new brakes, however appeared to experience more frequent technical issues during the rest of its operational life than it had done previously. The ride closed August 2017 prior to the season ending. The official line was that the ride was 'Closed for Maintenance', with the park reportedly ordering parts for further modernisation.

After nearly six decades in operation, the Wild Mouse was unceremoniously torn down over the 2017–18 closed season with no prior announcement made. Indeed, the ride was cited as being "closed for maintenance" on the park's official website even after the removal had taken place. After this became public through unofficial channels on Facebook, the management of Blackpool Pleasure Beach released a statement in January 2018 confirming the permanent removal of the ride from the park: "After very careful consideration and planning, our current winter work programme has seen the permanent closure and dismantling of the Wild Mouse and the removal of the facade of the former Trauma Towers attractions."

The site has since been largely empty since the ride's removal, separated from the park by hoarding. The area has since been used to host minor entertainment in a temporary events area named 'The Hub'

References

External links 
 YouTube video on-board Wild Mouse
 A review of the ride at Coasterkingdom.com

1958 establishments in England
2017 disestablishments in England
Wooden roller coasters
Blackpool Pleasure Beach
Roller coasters in the United Kingdom
Roller coasters introduced in 1958
Amusement rides that closed in 2017
Wild Mouse roller coasters